Klaarwater may refer to 

 Klaarwater in Griqualand West, a former name of the town of Griekwastad, Northern Cape, South Africa
 Klaarwater, a suburb of Durban in KwaZulu-Natal, South Africa
 Klaarwater, Soest, a residential area in the town of Soest in the central Netherlands
 Klaarwater, a hamlet to the east of Hoevelaken in the Netherlands